Kerem Baykuş (born 5 February 2000) is a Turkish professional footballer who plays as a midfielder for 1461 Trabzon on loan from Trabzonspor.

Professional career
Baykuş made his professional debut for Trabznnspor in a 3-1 UEFA Europa League loss to FC Basel on 12 December 2019.

Honours
Trabzonspor
Turkish Cup: 2019–20

References

External links
 
 

2000 births
People from Düzköy
Living people
Turkish footballers
Turkey youth international footballers
Association football midfielders
Trabzonspor footballers
İstanbulspor footballers
1461 Trabzon footballers
TFF First League players
TFF Second League players